The Citizens Association for Racial Equality (CARE) was a New Zealand organisation that fought against racism towards minority groups in New Zealand.

During the 1960s, CARE attacked policies such as the common de facto policy of banks not to employ Māori and compulsory pregnancy test for recent immigrants from Samoa. CARE became particularly famous in New Zealand through its vocal opposition to South African apartheid, particularly via organising resistance to any links with South Africa during the apartheid era. CARE was a leading participant in nationwide protests against the 1981 Springbok Tour.

In the 1970's, CARE protested against the Dawn Raids and succeeded in convincing the crew of a British cruise ship to refuse to sail with Tongan deportees onboard.

CARE's long term secretary was Tom Newnham.

References

Anti-racism in New Zealand
Anti-racist organizations in Oceania
Political groupings in New Zealand
Race relations in New Zealand